Mount Xiqiao is a 40- to 50-million-year-old extinct volcano situated in the south west of the Nanhai District, Foshan, Guangdong, People's Republic of China  from Guangzhou. The mountain is an important scenic area and designated as a national forest park and national geological park.

Geology
From 40–50 million years ago the entire Pearl River Delta was an ancient bay where a volcanic eruption ejected a large quantity of lava into the sea. On cooling, the molten rock formed a conical mountain; the embryonic form of Mount Xiqiao. Thereafter eruptions of lava continued and produced the current 72 peaks. After several million years of erosion by the sea, the area flattened and was gradually colonized by vegetation.

Scenery

Mount Xiqiao features unusual scenery with strange rock formations and a profusion of fresh water springs as well as 42 natural caves. In total there are 232 springs and 28 waterfalls including the Yunya Feipu, one of the Eight Views of Guangzhou during the 18th-century Qianlong Era.

Cultural background
As early as 6,000 to 8,000 years ago, human activity in the Mount Xiqiao area created a “Twin shoulder stone tool culture” that featured delicate stone tools including twin-shouldered stone axes. This greatly influenced development of culture around the Pearl River.

During the Ming and Qing Dynasties, a number of scholars including Zhan Ruoshui and He Baiyun lived in seclusion on the mountain where they studied Neo-Confucianism and painting. Amongst the most famous scholars was Chinese nationalist Kang Youwei who began planning the 1898 Hundred Days' Reform movement at Mount Xiqiao. Chinese martial artist Huang Feihong was born in the area, where he developed the Nanquan or “southern fist” fighting style.

Sightseeing areas

Today, Xiqiao Mountain is divided into ten major scenic areas including the Nanhai Guanyin Culture Park, which contains a  statue of the goddess Guanyin, the Baiyun Caves, and the Baofeng Temple.

References

External links
 Official government website
 Mount Xiqiao Tourism (English)

Mountains of Guangdong
Landforms of Guangdong
Volcanoes of China
Tourist attractions in Guangdong
Parks in Guangdong